Hammonasset Beach State Park is a public recreation area occupying two miles of beach front on Long Island Sound in the town of Madison, Connecticut. It is the state's largest shoreline park and one of the most popular attractions in the state, drawing an estimated one million visitors annually. The state park offers beach activities, large campground, and nature center. It is managed by the Connecticut Department of Energy and Environmental Protection.

History
The park began with the purchase of 499 acres in 1919. The park drew over 75,000 visitors in 1920, its first year of operation, a figure that grew to nearly 450,000 by its fifth year of operation, 1924. In 2013, Hammonasset accounted for over one-quarter of statewide park attendance and over one-third of the revenue generated statewide by the state park system. Officials estimate annual attendance at one million visitors.

The park closed during World War II when the site became a U.S. Army reservation and active aircraft firing range. In 1955, a stone breakwater was built at the Meigs Point end of the park.

Nature center
A new Meigs Point Nature Center was opened in 2016 to replace the center's original farmhouse site that had been in use for more than 40 years. The facility offers  of exhibit space with observation deck and hands-on learning experiences. Exhibits feature a touch tank and live turtles, snakes, amphibians, crabs and fish.

Activities and amenities
The park offers bicycling, boating, fishing, hiking, picnicking, and swimming as well as a campground with 550 units.

References

External links

Hammonasset Beach State Park Connecticut Department of Energy and Environmental Protection
Hammonasset Beach State Park Map Connecticut Department of Energy and Environmental Protection
Meigs Point Nature Center

State parks of Connecticut
Madison, Connecticut
Peninsulas of Connecticut
Parks in New Haven County, Connecticut
Landforms of New Haven County, Connecticut
Protected areas established in 1919
Nature centers in Connecticut
Campgrounds in Connecticut
Beaches of Connecticut
1919 establishments in Connecticut